The 1976–77 NBA season was the Warriors' 31st season in the NBA and 14th in the San Francisco Bay Area. In the playoffs, the Warriors defeated the Detroit Pistons in the 1st round in three games before losing in the semi-finals in seven to the Los Angeles Lakers. The Warriors wouldn't return to the playoffs again until 1987.

Draft picks

Roster

Regular season

Season standings

z – clinched division title
y – clinched division title
x – clinched playoff spot

Record vs. opponents

Playoffs

|- align="center" bgcolor="#ffcccc"
| 1
| April 12
| Detroit
| L 90–95
| Rick Barry (31)
| Clifford Ray (16)
| Rick Barry (6)
| Oakland–Alameda County Coliseum Arena12,459
| 0–1
|- align="center" bgcolor="#ccffcc"
| 2
| April 14
| @ Detroit
| W 138–108
| Phil Smith (35)
| Parish, Ray (12)
| Charles Dudley (14)
| Cobo Arena11,220
| 1–1
|- align="center" bgcolor="#ccffcc"
| 3
| April 17
| Detroit
| W 109–101
| Rick Barry (35)
| Robert Parish (18)
| Barry, Dudley (7)
| Oakland–Alameda County Coliseum Arena13,155
| 2–1
|-

|- align="center" bgcolor="#ffcccc"
| 1
| April 20
| @ Los Angeles
| L 106–115
| Rick Barry (40)
| Clifford Ray (13)
| Charles Dudley (8)
| The Forum15,928
| 0–1
|- align="center" bgcolor="#ffcccc"
| 2
| April 22
| @ Los Angeles
| L 86–95
| Wilkes, Parish (16)
| Robert Parish (11)
| Rick Barry (6)
| The Forum17,505
| 0–2
|- align="center" bgcolor="#ccffcc"
| 3
| April 24
| Los Angeles
| W 109–105
| Rick Barry (40)
| Clifford Ray (15)
| Charles Dudley (7)
| Oakland–Alameda County Coliseum Arena13,155
| 1–2
|- align="center" bgcolor="#ccffcc"
| 4
| April 26
| Los Angeles
| W 114–103
| Jamaal Wilkes (27)
| Clifford Ray (15)
| Charles Dudley (10)
| Oakland–Alameda County Coliseum Arena13,155
| 2–2
|- align="center" bgcolor="#ffcccc"
| 5
| April 29
| @ Los Angeles
| L 105–112
| Rick Barry (28)
| Wilkes, Parish (13)
| Charles Dudley (6)
| The Forum17,505
| 2–3
|- align="center" bgcolor="#ccffcc"
| 6
| May 1
| Los Angeles
| W 115–106
| Rick Barry (27)
| Clifford Ray (11)
| Charles Dudley (10)
| Oakland–Alameda County Coliseum Arena13,155
| 3–3
|- align="center" bgcolor="#ffcccc"
| 7
| May 4
| @ Los Angeles
| L 84–97
| Jamaal Wilkes (24)
| Clifford Ray (14)
| Phil Smith (6)
| The Forum17,505
| 3–4
|-

Awards and records
 Jamaal Wilkes, NBA All-Defensive Second Team
 Rick Barry, NBA All-Star Game

References

Golden State Warriors seasons
Golden State
Golden
Golden